Pterostylis leptochila, commonly known as the Ravensthorpe rufous greenhood or narrow-lipped rustyhood is a plant in the orchid family Orchidaceae and is endemic to the south-west of Western Australia. Both flowering and non-flowering plants have a relatively large rosette of leaves. Flowering plants also have up to five large translucent white flowers with olive green and brown lines and markings and a narrow, insect-like labellum.

Description
Pterostylis leptochila is a terrestrial,  perennial, deciduous, herb with an underground tuber and a rosette of between six and ten leaves. Flowering plants have a rosette at the base of the flowering stem but the leaves are usually withered by flowering time. Flowering occurs from September to November.

Taxonomy and naming
Pterostylis leptochila was first formally described in 1989 by Mark Clements and David Jones from a specimen collected near Ravensthorpe and the description was published in Australian Orchid Research. The specific epithet (leptochila) is derived from the Ancient Greek words leptos meaning "fine" or "small" and cheilos meaning "lip" or "rim" referring to the narrow labellum of this orchid.

Distribution and habitat
The Ravensthorpe rufous greenhood grows in rocky soil in woodland and shrubland  between Jerramungup and Ravensthorpe in the Esperance Plains and Mallee biogeographic regions.

Conservation
Pterostylis leptochila  is classified as "not threatened" by the Western Australian Government Department of Parks and Wildlife.

References

leptochila
Endemic orchids of Australia
Orchids of Western Australia
Plants described in 1989